Chau Hoi Wah (Chinese: 周凱華, also known as Cathy Chau Hoi Wah; born 5 June 1986) is a Hong Kong badminton player, specializes in doubles play. She was the first ever Hong Kong player that won the Asian Championships in 2014, and also a bronze medalist at the World Championships in 2017 alongside Lee Chun Hei. She competed at the Asian Games for four consecutive times from 2006–2018, and also in 2016 Summer Olympics.

Career 
Born in Hong Kong, Chau moved to Canada together with her family when she was 9 years old. She returned to Hong Kong in 2005, and joining national training center. Partnered with Lee Chun Hei, she made a history for Hong Kong badminton, as the first ever Hong Kong player that won the Asian Championships in 2014. Chau and Lee won a Superseries title in 2015 Australian Open, and a bronze medal at the 2017 World Championships. She reached a career high as world number 6 in the mixed doubles event.

Chau spent 15 years of badminton career, and on her 34th birthday (5 June 2020), she announced her retirement from Hong Kong national team through her social media account. She then returned to Toronto, Canada, joining her family, and starting a new career as a coach in Mandarin Badminton Club.

Achievements

BWF World Championships 
Mixed doubles

Asian Championships 
Mixed doubles

East Asian Games 
Mixed doubles

BWF World Tour 
The BWF World Tour, which was announced on 19 March 2017 and implemented in 2018, is a series of elite badminton tournaments sanctioned by the Badminton World Federation (BWF). The BWF World Tour is divided into levels of World Tour Finals, Super 1000, Super 750, Super 500, Super 300 (part of the HSBC World Tour), and the BWF Tour Super 100.

Mixed doubles

BWF Superseries 
The BWF Superseries, which was launched on 14 December 2006 and implemented in 2007, was a series of elite badminton tournaments, sanctioned by the Badminton World Federation (BWF). BWF Superseries levels were Superseries and Superseries Premier. A season of Superseries consisted of twelve tournaments around the world that had been introduced since 2011. Successful players were invited to the Superseries Finals, which are held at the end of each year.

Mixed doubles

  Superseries Finals Tournament
  Superseries Premier Tournament
  Superseries Tournament

BWF Grand Prix 
The BWF Grand Prix had two levels, the BWF Grand Prix and Grand Prix Gold. It was a series of badminton tournaments sanctioned by the Badminton World Federation (BWF) which was held from 2007 to 2017.

Women's doubles

Mixed doubles

  Grand Prix Gold Tournament
  Grand Prix Tournament

BWF International Challenge/Series 
Women's doubles

Mixed doubles

  BWF International Challenge tournament
  BWF International Series tournament
  BWF Future Series tournament

References

External links 

 
 
 
 

1986 births
Living people
Hong Kong female badminton players
Olympic badminton players of Hong Kong
Badminton players at the 2016 Summer Olympics
Badminton players at the 2006 Asian Games
Badminton players at the 2010 Asian Games
Badminton players at the 2014 Asian Games
Badminton players at the 2018 Asian Games
Asian Games competitors for Hong Kong
Hong Kong emigrants to Canada
Canadian sportspeople of Hong Kong descent
Sportspeople from Toronto
Badminton coaches